"Heat of the Night" is a song by Mexican pop artist Paulina Rubio from her album, Brava!. The song was written by RedOne, Junior, Hajil, Joker, Sky and produced by RedOne. It was expected to be the 2nd single off the album, however, Paulina released "Me voy" instead. The song was originally produced for Jennifer Lopez and set to be on her 7th studio album Love?. Joey Guerra from the Houston Chronicle name it a "hymn of the summer", while Mike Wass from Idolator considering it as a "sultry dance anthem."

This song can also be found on the singer's most recent EPs, Brava! Reload and Bravísima!

Chart performance
Although the song wasn't released as a single, it managed to debut at No.46 on Billboard's Dance/Club Play Songs and peaked at No.16.

Live performances
Paulina performed the song on a TV show in Spain.

Charts

References

Paulina Rubio songs
English-language Mexican songs
Song recordings produced by RedOne
Songs written by RedOne
2011 songs
Songs written by Bilal Hajji
Songs written by AJ Junior
Songs written by Geraldo Sandell
Songs written by Jimmy Thörnfeldt